The 2021–22 Taoyuan Leopards season was the franchise's 1st season, its first season in the T1 League, its 1st in Taoyuan City. The Leopards are coached by Wang Chih-Chun in his first year as head coach. On April 10, 2022, the Leopards announced that Wang Chih-Chun resigned from head coach, and named Su Yi-Chieh as their interim head coach. On May 16, the Leopards announced Liu Chia-Fa as their new head coach.

Draft 

 Reference：

Standings

Roster 

<noinclude>

Game log

Preseason

Regular season

Regular season note 
 Due to the COVID-19 pandemic in Taoyuan, the Taoyuan City Government and Taoyuan Leopards declared that the games at the Chung Yuan Christian University Gymnasium would play behind closed doors since January 15 to 16.
 Due to the COVID-19 pandemic in Taiwan, the T1 League declared that the games on January 29, February 5 and 6 would postpone to April 30, May 1 and April 29.
 Due to the COVID-19 pandemic in Taiwan, the T1 League declared that the games on February 19 and 20 would postpone to March 25 and 11.
 Due to the COVID-19 pandemic in Taiwan, the T1 League declared that the games on April 2 and 3 would postpone to May 7 and 8.
 Due to the COVID-19 pandemic in Taiwan, the T1 League declared that the games at the University of Taipei Tianmu Campus Gymnasium would play behind closed doors since April 4 to 10.
 Due to the player of the TaiwanBeer HeroBears tested positive, the T1 League declared that the game on April 30 would postpone to May 6.
 Due to the Taoyuan Leopards cannot reach the minimum player number, the T1 League declared that the games on May 6 to 8 would postpone to May 19, 18 and 20.

Play-in

Play-in note 
 The fourth seed, TaiwanBeer HeroBears, was awarded a one-win advantage before play-in series.

Player Statistics 
<noinclude>

Regular season

Play-in

 Reference：

Transactions

Free agents

Additions

Subtractions

Awards

Yearly Awards

Import of the Month

References 

2021–22 T1 League season by team
Taoyuan Leopards seasons